The ESSE Purse Museum is a museum located in Little Rock, Arkansas featuring women's handbags, and the day-to-day items carried in them, illustrating the stories of American women's lives during the 1900s. Special topic exhibits are hosted, and the museum has a gift shop.  The museum's name is derived from the Latin infinitive for "to be".

History
The museum originated from the founder's interest in folk art.  In 2006, her personal collection of thousands of handbags was organized into a traveling exhibition that toured the United States through 2011.  Following the tour, the collection was put on display in a historic building in Little Rock's South Main ("SoMa") district.

Exhibits
The permanent exhibits showcase handbags that most women owned from the early 1900s through 1999, giving glimpses into their lives. Display cases set up by decade show the styles of purses women carried and their contents, reflecting the events of each decade and illustrating how war, fashion, and economics influenced the style and function of purses.  Special exhibits have included vintage Barbie dolls (2014), a local artist's series of paintings of women and their purses (2017), images and objects from African American women, 1891–1987 (2017), and paper dresses from the 1960s (2018).

Gallery

See also
Simone Handbag Museum in Seoul, South Korea
Museum of Bags and Purses in Amsterdam, Netherlands
Handbag collecting

References

External links
ESSE Purse Museum website
ESSE Purse Museum on Instagram
Videos about the museum
Little Rock's "SoMa" district

Fashion museums in the United States
Museums established in 2013
2013 establishments in Arkansas
Museums of American art
Buildings and structures in Little Rock, Arkansas
Bags (fashion)